The men's ne-waza 69 kg competition in ju-jitsu at the 2017 World Games took place on 28 July 2017 at the GEM Sports Complex in Wrocław, Poland.

Results

Gold medal bracket

Bronze medal bracket

References

Ju-jitsu at the 2017 World Games